Wehrau may refer to:

Osiecznica, Lower Silesian Voivodeship, a village in south-western Poland
Wehrau (river), of Schleswig-Holstein, Germany